Oenopota biconica is a species of sea snail, a marine gastropod mollusk in the family Mangeliidae.

Description
The length of the shell varies between 10 mm and 14 mm.

Distribution
This species occurs in the Sea of Japan.

References

 Bogdanov, IP. "7 New Species of Subfamily Oenopotinae from the Okhotsk Sea." Zoologichesky Zhurnal 68.11 (1989): 147–152.

External links
 

biconica
Gastropods described in 1989